Armee-Abteilung Gaede / Armee-Abteilung B (Army Detachment B) was an army level command of the German Army in World War I.  It served on the Western Front throughout its existence and formed the extreme left wing (up against the Swiss Border).

History
After the 7th Army had repulsed the French invasion at the Battle of Mülhausen, it marched north to participate in the Race to the Sea.  It left behind in Upper Alsace three Landwehr Brigades under the command of the Deputy Commander of XIV Corps, General der Infanterie Hans Gaede.  This detachment was designated as Armee-Gruppe Gaede on 19 September 1914.  It was established as Armee-Abteilung Gaede on 30 January 1915 and renamed on 4 September 1916 as Armee-Abteilung B.  It was still in existence when the war ended, serving on the Western Front as part of Heeresgruppe Herzog Albrecht von Württemberg.

Order of Battle on formation
The following Orders of Battle illustrate the growth of the Armee-Abteilung during the war.

Order of Battle, 30 October 1918
By the end of the war, the majority of the units assigned were lower quality Landwehr and Cavalry Schützen Divisions indicative of the relatively quiet sector that the Armee-Abteilung was operating in.

Commanders
Armee-Abteilung B had the following commanders during its existence:

Glossary
Armee-Abteilung or Army Detachment in the sense of "something detached from an Army".  It is not under the command of an Army so is in itself a small Army.
Armee-Gruppe or Army Group in the sense of a group within an Army and under its command, generally formed as a temporary measure for a specific task.
Heeresgruppe or Army Group in the sense of a number of armies under a single commander.

See also 

German Army order of battle, Western Front (1918)
XIV Corps

References

Bibliography 
 
 

B
Military units and formations of Germany in World War I
Military units and formations established in 1914
Military units and formations disestablished in 1918